Edward J. Kelley (1883 – May 13, 1960) was a one-term Democratic mayor of Norwalk, Connecticut from 1945 to 1947. He defeated Republican Ray Werme and Socialist Irving Freese. Kelley had previously been president of the Norwalk Common Council. He served in the Connecticut Senate from 1943 to 1945, filling the unexpired term of Stanley P. Mead.

He was the son of Henry Kelley, Sr. of New Canaan, Connecticut.

References 

1883 births
1960 deaths
Connecticut city council members
Democratic Party Connecticut state senators
Mayors of Norwalk, Connecticut
20th-century American politicians